Anna Markland (born 23 May 1964) is a British pianist who won the BBC Young Musician of the Year competition in 1982, playing Rachmaninov’s Second Piano Concerto and subsequently pursued a dual performing career as pianist and soprano.

Education and early life
She studied at Chetham's School of Music (1974–1983) with Heather Slade-Lipkin  and achieved an ARCM diploma at the age of 17.

Two years later, in 1984, she won an instrumental scholarship to Worcester College, Oxford where she studied for a BA Honours degree in Music while continuing her piano performance schedule, also singing with the choir or Worcester College and with Schola Cantorum of Oxford. This was followed by two years' postgraduate piano study with Philip Fowke and vocal study with Kenneth Bowen at the Royal Academy of Music.

Markland has featured in a long-term study of the lives of gifted children.

Career

Pianist 
In 1982, Markland was the first female and pianist to win the BBC Young Musician of the Year competition. This activated a career as a pianist primarily based in the UK and comprising solo recitals, concerto performances, accompaniment and masterclasses. She has performed with several British orchestras including the BBC Northern Symphony Orchestra, Royal Philharmonic Orchestra, and the London Philharmonic Orchestra.

She has accompanied vocalists including Roderick Williams, James Gilchrist, Paul Agnew, Nicholas Mulroy, Matthew Brook, and Clare Wilkinson. She has also accompanied the vocal ensemble I Fagiolini.

Markland has run Masterclasses for schools, including at Monkton Combe School near Bath in 1998.

Soprano 
In 1986, while studying at Oxford, Markland became a founding member of the vocal ensemble I Fagiolini. She subsequently toured and recorded extensively with the group, which specialises in Renaissance and contemporary music and has received a number of awards.

She has also performed (as Anna Crookes) with Tenebrae (founding member), The Finzi Singers (founding member), Britten Sinfonia Voices (founding member), The Sixteen, The Monteverdi Choir, The Dunedin Consort, Trinity Baroque, Les Arts Florissants, La Grande Chapelle, The Scholars’ Baroque Ensemble, Pixels Ensemble and the BBC Singers.

Audio recordings

Radio and television
Markland appeared throughout the 1982 BBC Young Musician of the Year series and in subsequent years as an interviewed guest in 1984 and as a judge in 2010 for the keyboards category final. She was interviewed on BBC World Service's Meridian shortly after winning the competition, she was the subject of a BBC documentary feature on past competition winners in 1984, twice again in 1986, and then in 1988.

She presented a series of BBC Radio 3’s Young Artists’ Forum highlights in 1995.

She stars, as Anna Crookes, in John La Bouchardière's 2007 film The Full Monteverdi.

On the subject of gifted children, she was interviewed on BBC Radio 4's Woman's Hour programme in September 2010 and in I was a Child Prodigy (2008).

She has performed live on BBC Radio 3's In Tune in April 2016.

Filmography

References

External links
 Winners of the BBC Young Musician of the Year

1964 births
Living people
British classical pianists
British sopranos
Women classical pianists
21st-century classical pianists
21st-century English women musicians
Musicians from Merseyside
People from Wallasey
People educated at Chetham's School of Music
Alumni of Worcester College, Oxford
Eurovision Young Musicians Finalists
Decca Records artists
Associates of the Royal College of Music
21st-century women pianists